Fénis is a town and comune in the Aosta Valley region of north-western Italy.

It is especially known for Fénis Castle, a well-preserved medieval castle.

External links
  MAV, Museum of Aosta Valley's traditions - Fénis
  Official Fénis web site for tourists

 
Cities and towns in Aosta Valley